Edentulina is a genus of air-breathing land snails, terrestrial pulmonate gastropod mollusks in the family Streptaxidae.

Distribution 
Distribution of the genus Edentulina include:
 East Africa
 Tanzania
 Comores
 the Seychelles

Species
Species within the genus Edentulina include:
 Edentulina affinis Boettger, 1913
 Edentulina ambongoaboae Emberton, 1999
 Edentulina ambra Emberton, 1999
 Edentulina analamerae Emberton, 1999
 Edentulina ankaranae Emberton, 1999
 Edentulina anodon (L. Pfeiffer, 1855)
 Edentulina antankarana Emberton, 1999
 Edentulina arenicola (Morelet, 1860)
 Edentulina battistinii Fischer-Piette, Blanc, F. & Salvat, 1975
 Edentulina bemarahae Emberton, 1999
 Edentulina crosseana (Morelet, 1881)
 Edentulina dussumieri (Dufo, 1840) - subspecies: Edentulina dussumieri dussumieri (Dufo, 1840); Edentulina dussumieri reservae Gerlach & Bruggen, 1999; Edentulina dussumieri silhouettae Gerlach & Bruggen, 1999; Edentulina dussumieri praslina Gerlach & Bruggen, 1999. The subspecies praslina is only known as subfossil.
 Edentulina florensi Emberton, 1999
 Edentulina insignis (L. Pfeiffer, 1857)
 Edentulina johnstoni (E. A. Smith, 1887) 
 Edentulina langiana Pilsbry, 1919
 Edentulina liberiana (I. Lea, 1840)
 Edentulina martensi (E. A. Smith, 1882)
 Edentulina minor (Morelet, 1851)
 Edentulina moreleti (Adams, 1868)
 Edentulina nitens (Dautzenberg, 1895)
 Edentulina obesa (Taylor, 1877)
 Edentulina oleacea (Fulton, 1903)
 Edentulina ovoidea (Bruguière, 1789) (taxon inquirendum)
  Edentulina parensis Verdcourt, 2004
 Edentulina rugosa Emberton, 1999
 † Edentulina rusingensis Verdcourt, 1963 
 Edentulina uluguruensis Bequaert & Clench, 1936
 Edentulina usambarensis Bequaert & Clench
Taxa inquerenda
 Edentulina grandidieri Bourguignat, 1890 
Species brought into synonymy
 Edentulina affinis C. R. Boettger, 1913: synonym of Edentulina ovoidea (Bruguière, 1789) (junior synonym)
 Edentulina montis Fischer-Piette, Blanc, F. & Salvat, 1975: synonym of Edentulina minor (Morelet, 1851)

References

 Bank, R. (2017). Classification of the Recent terrestrial Gastropoda of the World. Last update: July 16th, 2017

External links
 

Streptaxidae
Taxonomy articles created by Polbot